Zalman Abramovich Gorelik (5 April 1908 in Bobruisk – 16 February 1987 in Minsk) was a geologist, tectonist, and organizer of the Geological Survey of Belarus. He was also co-discoverer of the first deposits of potash, rock salt, and oil in the Pripyat Trough. Doctor of Geological and Mineralogical Sciences (1973).

References 

1908 births
1987 deaths
Belarusian geologists
Scientists from Minsk
Soviet geologists